The 2022 RFL League 1 is a professional rugby league football competition played in the United Kingdom and is the third tier of the sport for Rugby Football League (RFL) affiliated clubs. The sponsors for the league are the bookmakers, Betfred and the league will continue to be known as the Betfred League 1.

The league was won by the Keighley Cougars who clinched the title after round 20 having won all 18 of their games to that point. The Cougars went on to win all 20 matches and become only the fourth team in the European game to complete a perfect season.  Cougars' players also topped all the regular season point scoring totals with Mo Agoro being the divisions top try-scorer with 28 and Jack Miller topping the goal-scoring table with 133 goals as well as heading the points-scoring table with 338 points. Overall Swinton's Dan Abram was the leading goal-scorer with 139 goals in the regular season and the play-offs.

The Swinton Lions won the promotion play off final 16–10, to earn an immediate return to the Championship, after being relegated last season.

Total attendances for the season were 81,919 while the average attendance for regular season games was 711. The average attendance was an increase of 79 per game compared to the 2019 season (the last full season with no restrictions due to COVID-19).

Rule changes
The RFL approved three rules changes for 2022. On 20 January 2022, The RFL confirmed that scrums would return to all competitions, having been suspended as part of the game's COVID-19 response in 2020 and 2021. Scrums are only being reintroduced for errors (knock-on, forward pass or accidental offside) in the first four tackles of a set. Other cases, where previously a scrum would have been awarded, for example - ball into touch on the full, ball kicked or passed into touch, incorrect play the ball; will result in a handover.

The ball steal law will revert to the 2020 rule where the ball can only be stolen in a one-on-one tackle and not during a multi-person tackle where the additional tacklers have peeled off the tackle before the steal. Finally, injured players will be required to leave the pitch for treatment, if possible, following complaints that stoppages for injury spoil the speed and flow of the game.

Teams
2022 was due to see the second professional rugby league team in Canada, Ottawa Aces, join League 1 and increase the number of teams in the division to 11. However, in October 2021 the company behind the Ottawa club announced that due to the COVID-19 pandemic, the club would relocate to the United Kingdom.  The following month, the club's new home and name were announced with the team to be called Cornwall RLFC and be based in Penryn, Cornwall.

Also in October 2021, Coventry Bears was rebranded as Midlands Hurricanes and would for 2022 be leaving Butts Park Arena in Coventry to play at Birmingham & Solihull R.F.C.'s Portway ground south of Birmingham.

Oldham, who were relegated from the Championship, relocated to the Vestacare Stadium for 2022.

Stadiums and locations

Fixtures and results

The season comprised 22 rounds with each of the 11 teams playing each other home and away. Each team had 20 fixtures and byes in two rounds.  The fixture list was released on 13 November 2021.  Promotion was confirmed with two clubs to be promoted to the 2023 Championship.  

The round 5 fixture between West Wales and Doncaster was forfeited by West Wales when the Welsh club failed to arrange the necessary medical cover. Under RFL operational rules the match was awarded to Doncaster as a 48–0 win. For the same reason, London Skolars forfeited the round 14 match against Keighley Cougars; the match being recorded as a 48–0 win for Keighley.

The 108 fixtures played saw a total of 6,413 points scored and attendance was 77,814 (average 721 per game). The six play-off matches added 298 points and 3,882 to the attendances.

Regular season table

Play-offs

The play-offs used the same structure used since 2019 with the team finishing first gaining automatic promotion and the teams finishing second to sixth competing in a four-round play-off series with one other team gaining promotion.

Team bracket

Summary

End of season awards
The League One awards were made on 26 September.  Four awards were made:
Club of the year: Keighley Cougars
Coach of the year: Rhys Lovegrove (Keighley Cougars)
Young player of the year: George Roby (Swinton Lions)
Player of the year: Jack Miller (Keighley Cougars)

References

Notes

Sources

RFL League 1
League 1
League 1